Monte Sacro Alto (also known informally as Talenti) is the 28th  of the city of Rome in Italy, and it is identified by the initials Q. XXVIII. As a quarter, or second level administrative division, it is one of two that comprise the first level division or Municipality of Municipio III.

Monte Sacro Alto is situated in the north-eastern area of the capital. The name of the  comes from Monte Sacro, a nearby hill that was the site of rituals by augurs or haruspices, while the common name Talenti is taken after the Talenti's noble family, which owned the estate where the residential area developed.

History 
Born in the 1960s as a natural extension of Monte Sacro, the area was previously a rural zone, basically inhabited only by shepherds and flocks. At the end of the 1950s the Talenti farm merged with the construction company owned by Giuseppe Tudini, an engineer, creating the Impresa Tudini & Talenti, that obtained by the municipality the permission to build in the area. The new quartiere is characterized by residential buildings and flat complexes, generally with 4 or 5 stories and surrounded by a court, intended for the upper middle class (somewhat counterbalancing the "old" Monte Sacro, traditionally a working-class borough).

Until 1965, the area was served by Sira, a devoted public transport company.

Geography

Boundaries
Northward and eastward, the quartiere borders with Zona Casal Boccone (Z. IV), whose border is marked by the stretch of Via della Bufalotta between Via della Cecchina and Via Roberto Bracco and by Via Roberto Bracco itself; then the boundary runs through the countryside up to Via Arrigo Cajumi and through the Parco Talenti, up to Via di Casal Boccone, the latter marking the border up to Via Nomentana.

Southward, the quartiere borders with Quartiere Ponte Mammolo (Q. XXIX), from which is separated by Via Nomentana, up to Via Jacopo Sannazaro.

To the west, the quartiere borders with Quartiere Monte Sacro (Q. XVI), whose boundary is marked by Via Jacopo Sannazaro, by a stretch in the countryside, by a short stretch of Viale Jonio, by Via Matteo Bandello and by Via della Cecchina.

Local geography
The main square of the district is Piazza Piercarlo Talenti, named after a descendant of the Talenti family who precociously died in a road accident in 1925. Another relevant square is Largo Sergio Pugliese, the local terminus of the public transport.

The main arteries of the area are Via Ugo Ojetti, with a high concentration of commercial activities, Via Arturo Graf and Via Renato Fucini.

Several green areas are located in Monte Sacro Alto, usually remains of the Agro Romano countryside, like Parco Talenti, Parco della Cecchina and Parco delle Mimose.

Almost all the roads and the squares in the quartiere are dedicated to authors, poets and journalists, e.g. Via Giuseppe Cesare Abba, Via Pietro Aretino Via Cecco Angiolieri, Via Elisabetta Barrett, Via Luigi Capuana, Via Melchiorre Cesarotti, Piazza Sergio Corazzini, Via Grazia Deledda, Via Teofilo Folengo, Via Veronica Gambara, Piazza Guido Gozzano, Via Ada Negri, Via Luigi Pirandello, Via Franco Sacchetti, Piazza Leonardo Sciascia, Via Gaspara Stampa, Via Giovanni Verga.

Places of interest

Churches
 San Mattia
 Sant'Achille
 San Ponziano

Other
 "Fabrizio Frizzi" RAI television studios

References